The 2014 Beach Handball World Championships were a twelve-team tournament in both men's and women's beach handball, held at Recife, Brazil from 22–27 July, 2014. It was the sixth edition of the event.

Just like two years prior, Brazil again won the gold medal in both, the men's and women's competition.

Format
The twelve teams were split into two groups of six teams. After playing a round-robin, the three top ranked team advanced to the Main Round. Every team kept the points from preliminary round matches against teams who also advanced. In the main round every team had 3 games against the opponents they did not face in the preliminary round. The top four teams advanced to the Semifinals. The three bottom ranked team from each preliminary round group were packed into one group. The points won against the teams who were also in this group were valid. Every team played three games and after those round there wereplacement matches from 7th–12th place.

Matches were played in sets, the team that wins two sets is the winner of a match. When teams are equal in points the head-to-head result was decisive.

Draw
The draw was held on 9 May.

Men

Participating nations

Preliminary round

Group A

Group B

Main round (Group C)

Consolation round (Group D)

Placement matches

Eleventh place game

Ninth place game

Seventh place game

Fifth place game

Finals

Final ranking

Awards
MVP
 

Topscorer
 

All-star team
Goalkeeper: 
Right wing: 
Left wing: 
Pivot: 
Defender: 
Specialist: 

Fair play award
 
Chosen by team officials and IHF experts: IHF.info

Women

Participating nations

Preliminary round

Group A

Group B

Main round (Group C)

Consolation round (Group D)

Placement matches

Eleventh place game

Ninth place game

Seventh place game

Fifth place game

Finals

Final ranking

Awards
MVP
 

Topscorer
 

All-star team
Goalkeeper: 
Right wing: 
Left wing: 
Pivot: 
Defender: 
Specialist: 

Fair play award
 
Chosen by team officials and IHF experts: IHF.info

References

External links
Official website
Men's tournament on IHF
Woen's tournament on IHF

Beach World Championships
2014 Beach Handball World Championships
Beach Handball World Championships
Beach Handball World Championships